Trevelin is a town in the western part of the Patagonian Argentine province of Chubut.

History 
The town was important in the Welsh settlement of Chubut. Evans had previously become well known for leading expeditions into the Pampas in search of new lands and mineral reserves, which had earned him the nickname 'El Baqueano' (meaning guide or scout).

One of the tourist attractions of Trevelín is the grave of Malacara, Evans' horse, who a few years earlier in 1884 had saved his master's life by escaping down a steep ravine when his travelling party was attacked by a group of indigenous people led by Cacique (chief) Foyel. The three other Welshmen with whom he was travelling (Richard Davies, John Hughes and John Parry) were killed and buried nearby at a place now known as 'Dyffryn y Merthyron' or The Valley of the Martyrs.

Following a territorial dispute between Argentina and Chile in early 1902, the Limits Commission met in School No.18, Trevelin on 30 April of that year. The British arbiter was Sir Thomas Holdich (King's Surveyor General of India) whilst the interested parties were represented by Francisco Pascasio Moreno (Argentina) and Dr. Balmaceda (Chile). The inhabitants of the area (both the indigenous Mapuche Tehuelche and the Welsh colonists) voted to remain in Argentina.

The Percy River was named after Percy Wharton, an American who was settled in Cwm Hyfryd between 1885 and 1904 before returning to Los Angeles, USA.

A replica of John Evans' Los Andes Flour Mill can be found today at the Nant Fach Museum, Trevelin, in an area known as Comarca de los Alerces. The decline of the flour milling industry in the area can be dated to 1949 when the government of Juan Perón declared that the Chubut region was not appropriate for the cultivation of wheat, and therefore the land was turned over to the rearing of cattle.

Climate

Trevelin has a cool summer humid climate (Köppen Cfb), but with a rainfall pattern similar to the Mediterranean climate. The climate is milder than that of other locations on the Argentine side of Northern Patagonia because of the low altitude and the direct exposure to Pacific winds. This microclimate allows for intensive agriculture, a rarity in the region where mid-summer frosts occur every year. Nighttime temperatures rarely drop below  and although snowfall is frequent, it does not cover the ground for long periods of time. Winters are stormy with frequent rain, sleet and snow while summers are cool, windy and relatively dry.

The precipitation pattern resembles a Mediterranean one, where most (75%) of the precipitation is concentrated from April to August, the cooler months with a dry period from September to March. Snowfall can occur during the colder months while rainfall predominates in warmer months; hail rarely occurs.

Frosts can occur at any time, even in summer, which limits the range of agricultural activities.

References

Notes

Sources

External links 

 Project-Hiraeth – Documents the stories of the Welsh colony in Patagonia, Argentina through film, text and illustration.

Populated places in Chubut Province
Populated places established in 1888
Welsh settlement in Patagonia
Argentina
Cities in Argentina